Amjad Shokouh Maghahm is an Iranian football midfielder.

Career
Shokouh Magham joined Aluminium in summer 2012.

Club career statistics

References

External links 
Amjad Shokouh Magham at PersianLeague.com

People from Sanandaj
Iranian footballers
Association football midfielders
Saba players
F.C. Aboomoslem players
Shahin Bushehr F.C. players
Sanat Naft Abadan F.C. players
Aluminium Hormozgan F.C. players
Shahr Khodro F.C. players
1983 births
Living people